Navascués (Nabaskoze in Basque) is a town and municipality in the province and autonomous community of Navarre in northern Spain. It has a population of under 200.

It is located in the non-Basque-speaking area of the province, in Merindad Sangüesa and 62 km from the capital, Pamplona. Spanish is the only official language since Basque has no official status.

References

External links
 NAVASCUES in the Bernardo Estornés Lasa - Auñamendi Encyclopedia (Euskomedia Fundazioa) 

Municipalities in Navarre